Click is a ghost town in Llano County, Texas, on County Road 308, southeast of Llano and southwest of Kingsland. The community was named for settler Malachi Click. Many descendants of Malachi Click are buried in the Llano City Cemetery. Benjamin F. Lowe was appointed postmaster when Click got a post office in 1880. The post office was discontinued during World War II.

References

Geography of Llano County, Texas
Ghost towns in Central Texas